Kakadu (1988) is a composition for orchestra by Peter Sculthorpe. It is one of the broad landscape compositions for which the composer is best known. Sculthorpe used his knowledge of the World Heritage listed Kakadu National Park from studying photographs and listening to recordings of Northern Australian Aboriginal music.

Conception
The composer explained the way he conceived Kakadu thus:

Sculthorpe also used some material from his earlier works Djilile (1986) and Manganinnie (1980).

Instrumentation
The music is scored for two flutes; two clarinets in B flat; two oboes; cor anglais; two bassoons; contrabassoon; four horns in F; four trumpets in C; two tenor trombones; bass trombone; tuba; timpani; percussion (three players); strings. Didgeridoo is optional.

Commission and performance
The work was commissioned by Emanuel Papper as a present for his wife upon her birthday and first performed by the Aspen Festival Orchestra, under Jorge Mester on 24 July 1988. It was voted number 51 in the 2011 ABC's Classic 100 Twentieth Century countdown.

The Australian premiere was given by the Melbourne Symphony Orchestra to celebrate Sculthorpe's 60th birthday in April 1989.

References

Compositions by Peter Sculthorpe
Compositions for symphony orchestra
1988 compositions
Kakadu National Park